Qalansawe or Qalansuwa (lit. "turban") is an Arab city in the Central District of Israel.

History

Medieval 
During the Abbasid Revolution in 750, which toppled the Umayyad Caliphate, numerous members of the Umayyad dynasty were deported to Qalansawe from Egypt for execution, including descendants of caliphs Umar II and Sulayman ibn Abd al-Malik. From the ninth century until the Crusader period, Qalansawe was a stop on the Cairo-Damascus road, between Lajjun and Ramla.

During the Crusader period, the village was known as Calanson, Calansue, Calanzon or Kalensue. In 1128, it was given to the Hospitallers by the knight Godfrey of Flujeac. Yaqut (d. 1229) wrote that Qalansawe, Castle of the Plans, of the Crusaders, was a fortress near Ramle. He adds that "many of the Omayyads were slain there." Remnants of a crusader fortress remain today. It remained in Hospitallers hands (except for 1187–1191) until Baybars took it in 1265. However, during this period the lord of Caesarea appears to have retained overlordship.

In 1265, after the Mamluks had defeated the Crusaders, Qalansawe was mentioned among the estates which Sultan Baibars granted his followers. It was divided equally between two of his  emirs: Izz al-Din Aidamur al-Halabi al-Salihi and Shams al-Din Sunqur al-Rumi al-Salihi.

Ottoman Empire 
In 1517,  the village was included in the Ottoman Empire with the rest of Palestine. It had a population of 29 Muslim households. They paid a fixed tax-rate of 33.3% on agricultural products, including wheat, barley, summer crops, olives, goats or beehives, and a press for olives or grapes; a total of 11,342  akçe. 

Pierre Jacotin called the village Qalensawi on his map from 1799.

19th century 
In 1870 the French explorer Victor Guérin found it to have 500 inhabitants. He then "examined the remains of a beautiful church, built east and west, and divided into three naves, terminating to the east in three apses. It was formerly constructed of good cut stones, some of which were slightly embossed, as is proved by the portions still standing. The naves were separated one from the other by monolithic columns, only the positions of which can be traced. They were probably crowned by Corinthian capitals, for I found one in a house, of white marble, cut into a mortar by the inhabitants, who told me they brought it from the site of the church. The other capitals and shafts had disappeared. Probably they came from some more ancient building. An elegant door, with a pointed arch, is still standing. Under the nave runs a vaulted crypt, now divided into several compartments, which serve as a shelter for as many families. The good walls seem ancient. One of these is near the church; the other below the village. The latter is large, and surmounted by a vaulted arcade in cut stones."

In 1882, the Palestine Exploration Fund's Survey of Western Palestine described it as being of moderate size, and the seat of a Caimacam. In the centre of the village was a Crusader tower and hall, surrounded by the village houses, mostly made of adobe. Wells and a spring to the west supplied water.

British Mandate 
In the 1922 census of Palestine conducted by the British Mandate authorities, Qualansawe had a population of 871 Muslims, increasing in the 1931 census  to 1069, still all Muslim, in a total of 225 houses.

Israel

20th century 
During the 1948 Palestine war, Jewish forces had decided to "conquer and destroy" or later "expel or subdue" Qalansawe, but the village was not taken and was only transferred to Israeli sovereignty in May 1949 as part of the  Israel-Jordan armistice agreement. Political considerations then prevented the expulsion of the villagers.

In 1955 the village became a local council. In 1957 it was connected to running water. By 1962, land ownership had dropped to 6,620 dunams, mostly due to expropriation of land by the Israeli government in 1953–1954.

21st century 
In 2000 Qalansawe became a city.

In January 2017, the Israeli government demolished 11 buildings being built by 4 families, on the grounds that they were built without permits. The families were given two days notice, which they said was insufficient for any legal response. The mayor of Qalansawe, who announced his resignation, said that he had fought unsuccessfully for years for an expansion of the town's building plan, forcing the residents to build on agricultural land. Thousands of people rallied in support of the village and a one-day strike was called.

Demographics
In 2001, the ethnic makeup of the city was virtually all Arab Muslims without significant Jewish population. There were 7,700 males and 7,300 females. 53.2% of the residents were 19 years of age or younger, 17.1% were between 20 and 29, 17.9% between 30 and 44, 8.0% from 45 to 59, 1.6% from 60 to 64, and 2.2% 65 years of age or older. The population growth rate in 2001 was 3.5%.

See also
 Arab localities in Israel

References

Bibliography

  (pp. 199-201.)
 p. 19
  
 

Hartmann, Richard (1910): Die Straße von Damaskus nach Kairo Zeitschrift der Deutschen Morgenländischen Gesellschaft › Bd. 64  (Cited in Petersen, 2001)

  
 

 

 (pp. 95, 97)
 
 
  
   (p. 161) 
 (p. 47)

External links
Welcome To Qalansiwa
Survey of Western Palestine, Map 11:  IAA, Wikimedia commons

Cities in Israel
Arab localities in Israel
Triangle (Israel)
Sharon plain
Cities in Central District (Israel)
Castles and fortifications of the Knights Hospitaller